Darnell Kenneth Hall (born September 26, 1971 in Detroit, Michigan) is an American sprinter who specialized in the 400 metres. He ran for the later gold-winning Team USA in the preliminary heats of the men's 4 x 400 m relay at the 1992 Summer Olympics.

Athletic career
Hall, who grew up in Sojourner Truth public housing in Detroit, ran high school track for Detroit Pershing, winning the state championship in the 400 m with a time of 47.56 seconds. Hall attended Blinn College in Texas. Instead of transferring to an NCAA Division I school, at the age of 21 he decided to try for the 1992 US Olympic Team, and succeeded, winning a gold medal with the 4 x 400 m relay team.

Hall won the 1995 IAAF World Indoor Championships in Barcelona and finished sixth at the 1995 World Championships in Athletics in Gothenburg. At the 1993 IAAF World Indoor Championships he was on the 4 x 400 m relay team that won the gold medal.

His personal best 400 m time is 44.34 seconds, achieved in July 1995 in Lausanne.

Post-athletic career
Hall is a policeman in the Detroit Police Department. and he now runs a AAU youth track team

References

1971 births
Living people
American male sprinters
Athletes (track and field) at the 1992 Summer Olympics
Detroit Police Department officers
Medalists at the 1992 Summer Olympics
Olympic gold medalists for the United States in track and field
Track and field athletes from Detroit
World Athletics Indoor Championships winners
World Athletics Championships winners